Five ships of the Royal Navy have carried the name HMS Handy:

  was a  launched 1856, sold at Lagos 1868.
  was a Rendel gunboat (or 'flat-iron') launched 1882, used for gun trials, renamed Excellent 1891 as a gunnery training ship, renamed Calcutta 1916, renamed Snapper 1917, sold 1924, broken up 2008.
  was a  launched 1895, sold in Hong Kong 1916.
  was a H-class destroyer ordered by the Brazilian navy as Jurua, purchased by the British before launch, launched as Handy September 1939, renamed  January 1940, sunk 1943.

See also
 HM Tug Handy was requisitioned in 1915 while under construction, then sold in 1920 as Antonio Azambuja.

References

Royal Navy ship names